The Pensioners' Party of Bosnia and Herzegovina (Stranka penzionera-umirovljenika BiH) is a multi-ethnic political party in Bosnia and Herzegovina.

External links 

 Website

Pensioners' parties
Political parties in Bosnia and Herzegovina